Ledouxia is a genus of spiders in the family Thomisidae. It was first described in 2004 by Lehtinen. , it contains only one species, Ledouxia alluaudi, found in Mauritius and Réunion.

References

Thomisidae
Monotypic Araneomorphae genera
Spiders of Africa
Spiders of Réunion
Taxa named by Pekka T. Lehtinen